Bayat District is a district of Afyonkarahisar Province of Turkey. Its seat is the town Bayat. Its area is 411 km2, and its population is 7,687 (2021).

Composition
There is one municipality in Bayat District:
 Bayat

There are 12 villages in Bayat District:

 Akpınar
 Aşağıçaybelen
 Çukurkuyu
 Derbent
 Eskigömü
 İmrallı
 İnpınar
 Kuzören
 Mallıca
 Muratkoru
 Sağırlı
 Yukarıçaybelen

References

Districts of Afyonkarahisar Province